Mukhor Porag is a Bengali studio album of renowned Bollywood playback singer Shreya Ghoshal. Released January 1, 2000, the album consists of 8 tracks.

Track listing

References 

Shreya Ghoshal albums
1999 albums